Sargon Dadesho (born September 18, 1948 in Habbaniyah, Iraq) is an Iraqi-American author, broadcaster, activist, and nationalist leader of Assyrian descent. Dadesho is currently the head of various Assyrian organizations and political parties.

Biography
In the early 1970s, Dadesho was a vocal proponent for the Assyrian Universal Alliance. His pursuit of a more militant approach to finding solutions to Assyrian struggle in Iraq led him to leave the AUA and, with the help of a few former AUA members, form the Bet-Nahrain Democratic Party in California.

He has utilized the media for his political aims as president of Bet-Nahrain Inc., a 501(c)(03) public charity non-profit organization that operates a 24/7 Assyrian television station, KSBV Channel 23 (AssyriaSat), out of Ceres, California. Along with AssyriaSat, he also runs a radio program and a magazine.

The source of revenue for Bet-Nahrain, Inc. which funds Dadesho's projects is said to be member donations, membership fees, and bingo games. According to an IRS report in 2003, Bet-Nahrain, Inc.'s revenues totaled slightly over $325,000 and the total expenses over $407,000. Yet the cost of running the Assyrian satellite program and all other media outlets connected with Sargon Dadesho alone are well over $50,000 a month.

Criticism
His critics allege that Dadesho may be allowing other, more powerful political groups to utilize his media for their political objectives and, in return, providing him with much needed funds for the operation of his AssyriaSat television station. For example, two separate programs are cited for their anti-Iranian stance in which the presenters speak in Azerbaijani and Arabic inviting their viewers in the Middle East to battle the Iranian government in seceding the Azarbaijan and Khuzistan provinces for the Azeri and Arab populations, respectively.

In 1995, Dadesho won a $1.5 million settlement against Iraq for emotional distress suffered after an assassination attempt which was foiled by the FBI. Iraq appealed the decision, but a federal appeals court later affirmed the judgment.
In April 2003, he was awarded the money after a failed assassination attempt by a hired Iraqi assassin ten years previously. The money came from the confiscated assets of the Iraqi government, one of a number of victims to finally collect judgments from lawsuits filed after the first Gulf War. Dadesho remains the most vocal devotee of the "Assyrian only" camp, a position he has uncompromisingly held since the explosion of the Chaldean identity on the scene of Assyrian politics during the 1990 US Census.

Wilfred Bet-Alkhas, editor and publisher of the online newsletter Zinda Magazine, selected Dadesho as the "Assyrian Person of the Year" for 2004, saying that Dadesho was "celebrated as both an Assyrian nationalist and a nemesis of Assyrian political progress".

References

External links
 Assyrian Person of the Year 6754 – Zinda Magazine article

1948 births
Assyrian nationalists
Living people
American people of Iraqi-Assyrian descent